Corumbiara is a municipality located in the Brazilian state of Rondônia. Its population in 2020 was 7,220 and its area is 3,060 km².

References

Municipalities in Rondônia